Chastreix-Sancy is a small ski resort situated above the village of Chastreix in central France. The resort is the smallest of the three main resorts situated in the Monts Dore and has no skiable link to the other two resorts. The main activities offered at the resort are alpine skiing, cross-country skiing, snowshoeing, ski touring, dog sledding and hiking. It is a calm resort popular with families and locals, as it boasts gentle runs, panoramic views and short queues.

Geography
The resort is situated at an altitude of 1400m in the Monts Dore mountain range within the Massif Central, built on and between the Puy de Chabane and Mont Redon, on the west side of the Puy de Sancy, which is part of an ancient stratovolcano which has been dormant for 220,000 years. It is within the Parc naturel régional des volcans d'Auvergne and the commune of Chastreix in the Puy-de-Dôme département of the Auvergne région. It is about 40 km south west of the préfecture of the Puy-de-Dôme département Clermont-Ferrand, also capital of the Auvergne. The resort is sandwiched between the Cirque de la Fontaine Salée to the south-east and the Val d'Enfer, or Valley of Hell in English, to the north-east. Both of these have left the resort with no formal links to the other two resorts in the Massif du Sancy ski area.

Lift system

Les Carrières 1 & 2
Les Carrières 1 & 2 are a pair of green button lifts used primarily by beginners to access the two green runs, Les Carrières and Les Marmottes, that start from their top stations during the winter season. They were built by Gimar Montaz Mautino with a gap of 16 years between their respective constructions, with Les Carrières 1 being built first in 1969 and Les Carrières 2 being built afterwards in 1985. They both follow the same route with their pylons similarly spaced along the lines, and both have the motor placed at the bottom station, at an elevation of 1406m, and the tension applied at the top station, at an elevation of 1466m, with a vertical gain of 60m and a length of 402m. However their differences are that, due to the terrain, Les Carrières 2 has a slightly steeper maximum slope at 22% rather than the 20% of Les Carrières 1. In addition, with Les Carrières 2 being newer, it is faster. Les Carrières 2 has an operating speed of 3.6 m/s and a throughput of 900 people per hour, compared with the slower 3.5 m/s operating speed and 600 people per hour throughput of Les Carrières 1. Both the motors spin so that the passengers travel to the right of the pylons on their upwards journey.

L'École

Les Chalets

La Chambasse

Le Vallon

Le Redon

Le Baby Pingouin

See also
Super Besse 
Mont-Dore

References
http://www.sancy.com
http://www.ign.fr

External links
Official website
Webcam

Ski stations in France
Tourist attractions in Puy-de-Dôme
Sports venues in Puy-de-Dôme